Neobirsteiniamysis inermis is a deepwater mysid crustacean species of the genus Neobirsteiniamysis. One of the largest and the only known mysid, distributed in both polar regions.

References

Mysida